Felix Wierzbicki ( [Felix Paul Wierzbicki]; 1 January 1815, in Czerniawka, Volhynia, Poland, now Chernyavka, Zhytomyr Oblast, Ukraine – 26 December 1860, in San Francisco) was a Polish-American veteran of the November 1830 Uprising, physician, soldier, traveler, and writer.

In 1849, Wierzbicki published in San Francisco the first English-language book printed in California, California as It Is and as It May Be, or A Guide to the Gold Region. The book is an "unvarnished" description of the culture, peoples, and climate of the area at that time. Wierzbicki described prospective settlers, and included a survey of agriculture and hints on gold mining.

Wierzbicki died on 26 December 1860 in San Francisco and was buried there in the Laurel Hill Cemetery. His remains were later reinterred at the San Francisco National Cemetery.

Books
 The Ideal Man:  A Conversation between Two Friends, upon the Beautiful, the Good, and the True, as Manifested in Actual Life,  Boston, E.P. Peabody, 1842.  Signed A Philokalist ("Lover of Beauty"), credited to Wierzbicki.
California as It Is and as It May Be, or A Guide to the Gold Region, 1849.

Notes

References
 Miecislaus Haiman [Mieczysław Haiman], "Dr. Felix Paul Wierzbicki", in Polish Pioneers of California, Chicago, Polish R[oman] C[atholic] Union of America, 1940, pp. 39–43.
 George D. Lyman, "Wierzbicki:  The Book and the Doctor" (introduction to reprint of California as It Is and as It May Be, San Francisco, Grabhorn Press, 1933).

1815 births
1860 deaths
Polish explorers
November Uprising participants
Physicians from California
Polish emigrants to the United States
Writers from the San Francisco Bay Area
Burials at Laurel Hill Cemetery (San Francisco)
Burials at San Francisco National Cemetery